Saint Hripsime Church (Surb Hřip’simē yekeghetsi; sometimes Hripsimeh) is a seventh century Armenian Apostolic church in the city of Vagharshapat (Etchmiadzin), Armenia. It is one of the oldest surviving churches in the country. The church was erected by Catholicos Komitas to replace the original mausoleum built by Catholicos Sahak the Great in 395 AD that contained the remains of the martyred Saint Hripsime to whom the church is dedicated. The current structure was completed in 618 AD. It is known for its fine Armenian-style architecture of the classical period, which has influenced many other Armenian churches since. It was listed as a UNESCO World Heritage Site along with other nearby churches, including Etchmiadzin Cathedral, Armenia's mother church, in 2000.

History
A Hellenistic temple, similar to the Temple of Garni and dedicated to a pagan goddess, stood in the place of the church prior to the fourth century. During excavations in 1958 the foundation of a monumental stone building with Hellenistic ornaments was found under the supporting column.

Hripsime, along with the abbess Gayane and 38 unnamed nuns, are traditionally considered the first Christian martyrs in Armenia's history. They were persecuted, tortured, and eventually killed by king Tiridates III of Armenia. According to the chronicler Agathangelos, after conversion to Christianity in 301, Tiridates and Gregory the Illuminator built a martyrium dedicated to Hripsime at the location of her martyrdom, which was half buried underground. Excavations around the church have uncovered remains of several tortured women buried in early Christian manner, which, according to Agop Jack Hacikyan et al., "seem to support the story of Agathangelos." In 395 Patriarch Sahak Partev (Isaac the Parthian) rebuilt or built a new martyrium, which had been destroyed by Shapur II of the Sasanian Empire in the 360s.

The current building was erected during the reign of Catholicos Komitas (615–628), according to an account of contemporary chronicler Sebeos and two inscriptions, one on the west facade and the other on the east apse. It replaced the earlier mausoleum of Hripsime. The church is suggested by scholars to have been completed in 618. The dome was probably restored in the 10th or 11th centuries, although some scholars have argued that it is the original 7th century construction.

The church was dilapidated and abandoned by the early 17th century. According to an inscription on the western facade, the church was renovated by Catholicos Philipos, in 1653. Under his commission an open narthex (gavit) was erected in front of the western entrance. A bell tower was built on the narthex in 1790 under the commission of Catholicos Ghukas I of Karin.

In 1776 the church was fortified with a brick wall and towers on the corners by Catholicos Simeon I of Yerevan. In 1880 the eastern and southern walls were built of smoothly hewn stone.

The church underwent considerable renovation in 1898. Its foundations were strengthened and the roof and dome were repaired in 1936. In 1958 plaster from was removed from the interior walls and the interior floor was lowered. The bell tower was renovated in 1987.

Architecture

St. Hripsime Church is a domed tetraconch enclosed in a rectangle, with two angular niches on the northern and southern side. German art historian Wilhelm Lübke wrote that the church is built on "a most complicated variation of the cruciform ground-plan."

Reception
The monumental exterior of the church is "considered one of the great achievements of medieval Armenian architecture." It has been described as a "gem of Armenian architecture" and "one of the most complex compositions in Armenian architecture." Along with Saint Gayane Church, it stands as a "model of the austere beauty of early Armenian ecclesiastical architecture."

Imitations
The church is not the earliest example of this architectural form, however, the form is widely known in architectural history as the "Hripsime-type" since the church is the best-known example of the form. It has also been variously named "Jvari-type" or "Jvari-Hripsime-type" for Jvari in Georgia.

Notable churches with similar plans include the Surb Hovhannes (Saint John) Church of Avan (6th century), Surb Gevorg (Saint George) Church of Garnahovit (6th century), Church of the Holy Cross at Soradir (6th century), Targmanchats monastery of Aygeshat (7th century), Holy Cross Cathedral of Aghtamar (10th century), and Surb Astvatsatsin (Holy Mother of God) Church at Varagavank (11th century). 
The architectural form is also found in neighboring Georgia, where examples include the Ateni Sioni Church (7th century), Jvari monastery (7th century), and Martvili Monastery (10th century).

Gallery

Artistic and historic depictions

See also 
 Etchmiadzin Cathedral
 Saint Gayane Church
 Shoghakat Church
 Zvartnots Cathedral

References

Bibliography
Academic articles

Published books

External links 

 Saint Hripsime Church
 About Saint Hripsime Church

7th-century churches in Armenia
Buildings and structures in Armavir Province
Christian monasteries in Armenia
Oriental Orthodox congregations established in the 13th century
Tourist attractions in Armavir Province
World Heritage Sites in Armenia
Christianity in the Sasanian Empire
Sasanian Armenia
Churches completed in 618